Henry Weston may refer to:

Henry Weston (politician) (1534–1592), MP for Petersfield and Surrey
Henry Weston (cricketer) (1888–unknown), English cricketer active 1909–14
Henry Weston (rugby union) in 1901 Home Nations Championship
Henry Weston (newspaper proprietor) (1838–1920), owner of the Taranaki Herald

See also